This is a list of the France men's national basketball team results from 2020 to present.

Results and fixtures

2020

2021

2022

2023

Notes

References

External links
Official website 

Results
Basketball games by national team